The Al-Rashid Mosque was the first mosque built in Canada. It was constructed in Edmonton, Alberta.

History

Al-Rashid Mosque was expected to be the first mosque in North America but was built in 1938 just after the Mother Mosque of America in Cedar Rapids, Iowa and several years after the 1929 mosque built in Ross, North Dakota. At the time, there were about 700 Muslims in Canada. Hilwie Hamdon was the first woman to talk to Edmonton Mayor John Fry about purchasing land to construct the mosque. She, along with friends, collected fund from Jews, Christians and Muslims to construct the mosque.

The mosque was built by Ukrainian-Canadian contractor Mike Drewoth in a style resembling the Eastern Christian (Ukrainian Catholic and Orthodox) immigrant churches and opened on December 12, 1938. In the 1940s, the building was relocated from its original site to a location a few blocks away to make room for a school expansion.

By the 1980s, the mosque had been outgrown by the booming Muslim community, and had fallen into disrepair. The city, which owned the land on which it was located, was contemplating demolition of the site to expand a hospital. But in 1991, it was decided to move the mosque to Fort Edmonton Park at a cost of $75,000. About a year later on May 28, 1992, it was reopened in the park.

Muhammad Abdul Aleem Siddiqi was instrumental in the development of the mosque.

See also

List of mosques in Canada 
List of first mosques by country
 List of mosques in the Americas
 Lists of mosques

References

1938 establishments in Alberta
Mosques in Alberta
Religious buildings and structures in Edmonton
Mosques completed in 1938
Islamic organizations established in 1938
Tourist attractions in Edmonton
20th-century religious buildings and structures in Canada